Francis Thynne (c. 1544 – 1608) was an English antiquary and an officer of arms at the College of Arms.

Family background and early life
Francis Thynne was born in Kent, the son of William Thynne, who was Master of the Household of King Henry VIII. He attended Tonbridge School.

Career
Francis Thynne was an antiquary before being admitted to the College of Arms after several fruitless applications. He was finally appointed Blanche Lyon Pursuivant of Arms Extraordinary in 1602, the first instance of this office being "extraordinary". Immediately after this appointment, he was promoted to Lancaster Herald of Arms in Ordinary.

He had an eventful life, having been imprisoned for more than two years as a debtor and crippled with gout for much of his life. He was known to have assisted William Camden in his heraldic work and was recommended by Sir William Dethick for eventual promotion to the office of Norroy King of Arms. This promotion never occurred, and Thynne died circa November 1608. His arms were those of Botfield (his family's original name) and were blazoned Barry of ten Or and Sable.

Thynne's main importance is as an antiquary who formed part of the Elizabethan Society of Antiquaries, which was active between 1586 and about 1607.  They aimed to "construct a detailed and credible account of the origins and development of the English people". This club of lawyers, heralds and antiquarians largely consulted records in Latin but Thynne was remarkable for his ability to read Old English (Anglo-Saxon) sources.  Archbishop Matthew Parker had initiated the searches of the libraries of dissolved monasteries, primarily to find evidence for the historical singularity of the English Church, free from Rome.  However, the small circle of scholars he employed largely ceased research after his death, whilst his manuscripts disappeared into university college libraries.  Apart from Henry Savile's "poorly-executed" chronicles (1598), no further Anglo-Saxon texts were published until L'Isle's Saxon Treatise (1623) and Wheelock's edition of Bede's Historiae ecclesiasticae gentis Anglorum (1644). What is remarkable about Thynne is that he and only a few other antiquaries were mastering the Anglo-Saxon language.  The evidence for this comes from the published volumes of the proceedings of the Society of Antiquaries, where references are made to charters and other documents written in Old English. In a 1591 discussion on the origins of English shires, Thynne, together with James Ley and Thomas Talbot, display reasonable knowledge of Old English.

Thynne was perhaps the most scholarly of the antiquaries: "His work on Anglo-Saxon and medieval chronicles was solid and factual, based on his firm belief in the accuracy of the original manuscripts." For example, only he quotes Textus Roffensis.  No one in Parker's circle had known of its existence and it did not appear in print until 1644. Thynne used it in a 1604 discourse on the office of Earl Marshal, accurately transcribing the sentence from Peace (pax), "Ðus feor sceal beon þæs cinges grið fram his burhgeate, þær he is sittende, on feower healfe his, ðæt is III mila 7 III furlang 7 III æcera bræde 7 IX fota 7 IX scæftamunda 7 IX berecorna."  Thynne thought he was quoting a law of Æthelstan, not unreasonably, since it immediately follows the law-codes V and VI Æthelstan in Textus Roffensis.  However, Peace is really an extension of Æthelred's Wantage Code which, given its use of what are now known to be Scandinavian loan-words, such as grið (‘peace’,) was probably intended for use in the Danelaw.  Thynne thought this was some kind of official term, and such misunderstandings were inevitable when he was having to learn the language with almost no support and certainly no publicly available grammar or gloss.  He mostly relied on Ælfric’s Grammar and Glossary and his Colloquy which, intended as teaching aids for Latin, might also be used in reverse; the manuscripts of legal and religious texts available in Latin and English versions, and the few printed works to provide some Old English words or parallel texts.

If Thynne saw Textus Roffensis, then he travelled to Rochester to see it.  That is another unusual aspect of his activities. He travelled to see manuscripts, not only in Rochester but also in Winchester and in various gentlemen's private libraries in and around London.  For example, his various references to William of Malmesbury’s Gesta Regum Anglorum suggest he viewed the collection either of John Stow (who had worked on an edition of Chaucer with Thynne’s father in the 1530s) or of John, Lord Lumley.

Thynne was not wealthy. He "spent his life in libraries and his study". He failed to complete several manuscripts and the papers he read to the Society of Antiquaries contain only glimpses of his thoughts and interests.  His "significance lies in the manuscripts he collected, transcribed, and translated", but his most impressive achievement was to help keep the study of Old English alive after its shaky revival by Parker's circle.

References

Further reading

External links
 
 
 

1540s births
1608 deaths
Francis
People from Kent
English officers of arms
English genealogists
16th-century English writers
17th-century English writers
16th-century male writers
17th-century English male writers